Earle House may refer to:

Earle House (Canehill, Arkansas), listed on the National Register of Historic Places in Washington County, Arkansas
 Earle House (Sarasota, Florida), listed on the NRHP in Sarasota County, Florida
 John M. Earle House, Fall River, Massachusetts, listed on the NRHP in Massachusetts
 Col. Elias Earle Historic District, Greenville, South Carolina, listed on the NRHP in Greenville, South Carolina
Earle Town House, Greenville, South Carolina, listed on the NRHP in Greenville, South Carolina
 Williams-Earle House, Greenville, South Carolina, listed on the NRHP in Greenville, South Carolina
 Earle-Napier-Kinnard House, Waco, Texas, listed on the NRHP in McLennan County, Texas

See also
Earl House (disambiguation)